Balaraja is a town and district within Tangerang Regency in the province of Banten, Java, Indonesia.

The population at the 2010 Census was 111,475.

Toll Road access

References

Tangerang Regency
Districts of Banten
Populated places in Banten